The European 300 m Rifle Championships are special shooting sport championships of 300 metre rifle discipline, organized discontinuously as a stand alone championships by the International Shooting Sport Federation (ISSF) since 1959.

Disciplines
 300 m rifle three positions
 300 m rifle standard
 300 m rifle kneeling
 300 m rifle standing
 300 m rifle prone

Editions

See also
 ISSF shooting events
 International Shooting Sport Federation
 ISSF European Shooting Championships

References

External links
 
 European Champion Archive Results at Sport-komplett-de

 
 
European
Shooting sports in Europe by country